Filiatra, is a town and a former municipality in Messenia, Peloponnese, Greece. Since the 2011 local government reform it is part of the municipality Trifylia, of which it is a municipal unit. The municipal unit has an area of 114.877 km2. Filiatra is situated near the Ionian Sea coast in western Messenia. It is located 11 km northwest of Gargalianoi, 13 km southwest of Kyparissia, 29 km northwest of Pylos and 49 km west of Kalamata. The Greek National Road 9 (Patras - Pyrgos - Kyparissia - Pylos) passes through the town. Filiatra was founded around the 12th and the 13th centuries. It was built near the site of the ancient city Erana. Filiatra has several schools, churches and shops. A scaled reproduction of the Eiffel Tower stands at the entrance to the village. The local soccer club is Erani Filiatra.

Subdivisions
The municipal unit Filiatra is subdivided into the following communities (2011 population in brackets):
Chalazoni (154)
Christianoupoli (302)
Exochiko (179)
Filiatra
Mali (17)
Plati (71)

The community Filiatra consists of the following settlements, besides the Filiatra town proper: 
Agia Kyriaki
Agrilos
Kountri
Lagkouvardos - a beach area located near Agia Kyriaki
Lempestena
Limenari, the access from Filiatra to the sea.  It is around 2 km from the town centre 
Merolithi
Stomio
Vryses

Historical population

Notable people
The Liberopoulos brothers:
Nikos Liberopoulos, soccer player
Sotiris Liberopoulos, soccer player
Nikolaos Frousos, soccer player
Pavlos Dionysopoulos, artist
Theodoros Marangos, Film Director

See also

List of settlements in Messenia

References

External links
Municipal website 
Municipality of Filiatra Internet Portal 
Filiatra Forum 
Filiatra
Pirsos
Fykia Lyceum/Middle School 
Erani Sporting Club 

Populated places in Messenia
Eiffel Tower reproductions